Alen Roberti Simonyan (born 5 January 1980) is an Armenian politician currently serving as the president of the National Assembly of Armenia since 2 August 2021. He served as the acting president of Armenia from 1 February 2022 to 13 March 2022, and is a former member of Yerevan City Council.

Career 
Simonyan studied at the Faculty of Law of Yerevan State University, graduating in 2000. He would go on to serve two years in the Armed Forces of Armenia, before becoming Assistant to the Chairman of the Court of the First Instance of Ajapnyak and Davitashen Communities. From 2003 to 2004, he worked as a human resources manager at Converse Bank.

From 2006 to 2007, Simonyan worked at a radio station. He then cooperated with television companies TV5, Yerkir Media, and Armenia TV for the next five years, directing and producing a number of musical and political video clips. In 2012, he became Editor-in-Chief of "Ararat" magazine before founding Ararat Media Group LLC (araratnews.am web site and "Ararat" magazine).

Simonyan was one of a number of organizers of the "Car free" civil protest against the rise in prices for transportation.

On 30 May 2015, he was elected member of the Civil Contract party board, becoming a spokesperson for the party. He was re-elected on 30 October 2016.

From 2017 to 2018, Simonyan was a member of the Yerevan City Council in the composition of Way Out Alliance. On 16 May 2018, he was elected Member of the National Assembly by the national electoral list of the Way Out Alliance. Later that year, on 9 December 2018, he was elected member of the National Assembly by the national electoral list of the My Step Alliance.

On 15 January 2019, he was elected vice president of the National Assembly, then president of the National Assembly on 2 August 2021. After the resignation of President Armen Sarkissian on 1 February 2022, Simonyan assumed the powers and duties of president of Armenia as acting president.

Personal life 
Simonyan is married to Mariam Margaryan and has three children.

References 

1980 births
Living people
Members of the National Assembly (Armenia)
Politicians from Yerevan
Presidents of Armenia
Presidents of the National Assembly (Armenia)
Civil Contract (Armenia) politicians
21st-century Armenian politicians